Ole Bendixen (1869–1958) was a Danish explorer, merchant, and author who served as Royal Inspector of South Greenland from 1903 to 1914.

Bendixen was active in Greenland from the early 1890s, and rose through the ranks of the Royal Greenland Trading Company, which had administrated Greenland from the 18th century. He was appointed inspector (the highest post in the colony) of the south in 1903, and held the post for 11 years. Upon his retirement as inspector, he was awarded the Order of Vasa.

He led several expeditions in the Arctic in the 1910s, and was the author of several non-fiction books about Greenland.

See also
 List of inspectors of Greenland

References 

1869 births
1958 deaths
Danish explorers
Scandinavian explorers of North America
Greenlandic polar explorers
Inspectors of Greenland
19th-century Danish people
20th-century Danish people
History of the Arctic
People from Favrskov Municipality